A Hollywood novel is a novel that takes the Southern California motion picture industry as its setting and often its subject. Examples of Hollywood novels include The Day of the Locust by Nathanael West, What Makes Sammy Run by Budd Schulberg, The Last Tycoon by F. Scott Fitzgerald, City of Angels by Rupert Hughes, After Many A Summer Dies the Swan by Aldous Huxley, Inside Daisy Clover by Gavin Lambert, The Deer Park by Norman Mailer, I Should Have Stayed Home by Horace McCoy, Michael Tolkin's The Player and The Return of the Player, and  Joan Didion's Play It As It Lays. Novels set in Los Angeles but not primarily about the movie business and its effect on movie people and the public are not properly called Hollywood novels.

Background and Perception of Hollywood Novels

Many novelists such as William Faulkner and F. Scott Fitzgerald took jobs writing screenplays in Hollywood since they made more money. But many novelists such as them soon felt the film industry made them so miserable, and wrote novels detailing fictionalized versions of their experiences. Often some of these novels would revolve around some bitter screenwriter or producer who believed they were screwed over by some studio executive. And these same novels often took place during the Golden Age of Hollywood in the 1930s-1940's.

The Last Tycoon

The Last Tycoon is an unfinished novel written by Fitzgerald, but left incomplete before his death about a studio executive Monroe Stahr, and later adapted into The Last Tycoon starring Robert De Niro. Stahr is living for his job, focusing on nothing else but work, and is now suffering from a heart condition. The point of view of this novel is told through Cecelia Brady, the daughter of one of Stahr's fellow executives. She flirts with him, and wants to start some kind of love affair, but he is too wrapped up in his work to even try to think of her in romantic fashion.

What Makes Sammy Run?

What Makes Sammy Run?, written by Budd Schulberg, is told from the point of view of New York Times drama critic Al Manheim. It focuses on a 16-year-old Jewish boy named Sammy Glick, who rises out of the ghetto in New York to become a hot in demand screenwriter in Hollywood. The two become good friends almost from the start, but Al soon realizes that Sammy is a ruthless backstabber.

Hollywood Wives and Other Perceptions

Hollywood Wives was a novel written bestselling author Jackie Collins, and was from the point of view of several wives of screenwriters and producers, detailing how their wives dealt with the Hollywood lifestyle along with how it affected them. A couple years after the novel's release, it was turned into a made for television miniseries by Aaron Spelling, and was a huge hit for the ABC network. It was also most popular miniseries during the 1980s. Spelling also produced the hit television show Dynasty, which starred the author's sister, Joan Collins, who played the iconic role of Alexis Carrington in the series.

See also
List of Hollywood novels

References and External Links

Further reading
Brooker-Bowers, N.: The Hollywood Novel and Other Novels About Film, 1912-1982: An Annotated Bibliography, Garland, 1985.
Slide, A.: The Hollywood Novel: A Critical Guide to Over 1200 Works with Film-Related Themes or Characters, 1912 through 1994, McFarland & Co., 1995.

Literary genres
Culture of Hollywood, Los Angeles